Bidshahr Rural District is a rural district (dehestan) in Bidshahr District, Evaz County, Fars Province, Iran. At the 2006 census, its population was 13,111, in 2,579 families. The rural district has 18 villages.

References 

Rural Districts of Fars Province
Larestan County